Yusifbayli Nurali Adil Vice-Rector for Academic Affairs of the Azerbaijan Technical University

Early life 
Yusifbayli Nurali Adil was born on 28 March 1963 in Azerbaijan Republic. In 1980 he joined the Electroenergetics faculty of Kiev Polytechnic Institute (currently Kiev Technical Academy) and graduated in 1986 from that university's  "Electric Systems Cybernetics" specialty. 
From 1986 to 1989 he worked as an electrical engineer in Thermal Power Plant No.1 in Sumgait, heading the electrical department and power plant; from 1989 to 1993 he worked as head dispatcher at "Azerenergy" JSC.  He continued his activities as a chief, head dispatcher, deputy of chief engineer at "Azerenergy" JSC from 1993 to 2001. In 2001–02 he worked as deputy of Head director of  "Azerenergy" JSC "Energy transmission" Production Association. In 2002–09 worked as a chief of Central Dispatch Department.
In 2009–12 worked as a director of  "Azerenergy" JSC " Azerbaijan Scientific-Research and Design Institute of Power Engineering".  Within this time was chief of dissertation council on "05.14.02 - Electric power plant and electroenergy systems" EAC specialty under the President of the Republic of Azerbaijan.

Since 2012 was head advisor of the Ministry of Economy and Industry of the Republic of Azerbaijan, Counselor of the Minister since 2014 was chief of Strategic Planning Department of the Ministry of Economy and Industry of the Republic of Azerbaijan.

By decree of the president of the Republic of Azerbaijan from 13 March 2015 to 22 September 2020  was appointed deputy chairman of The State Agency on Alternative and Renewable Energy Sources.

By the order of the Minister of Education of the Republic of Azerbaijan No. K-44, he was appointed Vice-Rector for Academic Affairs of the Azerbaijan Technical University from January 18, 2021.

By decree of CIS Member countries of the president of  Electroenergetics Council, dated 20 October 2004, he was given the honorary title "CIS Honored power engineer".

By decree of the president of the Republic of Azerbaijan, dated 19 October 2005, he was given the honorary title -"honored engineer” of the Republic of Azerbaijan.

He was awarded "Golden Buta"  prize for the activity of the electric power system and the development and improvement of the application of scientific and project issues in  2011.

By decree of the president of the Republic of Azerbaijan, dated 21 October 2014, he was given the honorary title "honored scientist".

He received his degrees of Candidate of Technical Sciences in 1995 and Doctor of Technical Sciences in Azerbaijan Scientific-Research and Design-Prospecting Power Engineering Institute in 2004.

Doctor of Technical Sciences, professor, author of seven books, three Azerbaijan Standard and more than 130 scientific works.  Chief editor of International Scientific - production  "ELECTRO-energetics-technics-mechanics+control" journal. 
He is deputy chairman of  Board on Energy problem of  Azerbaijan National Academy of Sciences and member of Institute of Electrical and Electronics Engineers (IEEE), and editorial staff  “Power engineering” and "Applied Mathematics" journals and other scientific councils of research institutions. Since 1998, engaged in pedagogical activity, since 2003 is Professor of  "Management and Automation" Chair of Azerbaijan Technical University, and chairman of SAC. 
His research interests include reliability and security of power systems, development of national and interstate power grids, SCADA, Smart Grid technology, energy efficiency and safety, renewable energy.

Yusifbayli Nurali Adil is married and has two children.

Presentations 
 ON INTELLECTUALISATION OF OPERATIONAL AND EMERGENCY AUTOMATION CONTROL OF “POWER BRIDGE AGT”
 INTELLECTUAL VOLTAGE MANAGEMENT IN ELECTRICAL NETWORKS

Awards 
 20.10.2004 - "Honored power engineer" of CIS.
 19.10.2005 - “Honored Engineer”.
 21.10.2014 - “Honored Scientist”.

Books 
Mенеджмент Энергосбережения
Elektrik sistemlərində keçid prosesləri
Elektroenergetika sistemlərinin yeni fəaliyyəti və inkişafı şəraitində dispetçer idarəçiliyi məsələlərinin əsasları
Rusca-Azərbaycanca-İngiliscə Elektroenergetika terminləri lüğəti
Elektrik sistemlərinin avtomatikası

References 

1963 births
Living people
Azerbaijani politicians
Energy development